= Porto Hill Seamount =

Seamount in the northeast Atlantic

- Summit depth: 1865 m

Location
- Location: North Atlantic Ocean
- Coordinates: 40°43′N 10°03′W
- Country: Portugal (EEZ)

Geology
- Type: Hill

The Porto Hill Seamount, previously known as Porto or Oporto Seamount is a seamount in the northeast Atlantic, located off Aveiro, Portugal but named after the city of Porto. It is about 30 km long and 10 km wide, and oriented north to south.
